The Shughni (also known as the Shughnan) (Shughni: ,) are an Iranian-Pamiri ethnic group who reside in the Pamir Mountains of the Badakhshan region of Central Asia.  They mostly live in the country of Tajikistan, while a minority lives in Afghanistan, Pakistan, and China.  They speak the Shughni language, an Eastern Iranian language of the Pamiri subgroup.

History 
The region of Shughnan was mentioned in Chinese books during the 6th and 7th centuries.  The ancient Shughnis kept the Shughnan region under their control.  Proof had been found about the Shughni people's oral traditions in Ghoron.  The Shughni tribes had also collaborated with the Mongols during the conquest of Afghanistan.  During Soviet times, especially during the Stalin era, Soviet and Tajik authrorities tried their best to assimilate the Shughni with the Tajik population. Even after Soviet times, the Shughni, Ishkashim, Rushan, and Wakhi tribes still fought over territory near the borders of Afghanistan and Tajikistan.

Lifestyle 
Due to political reasons the Shughni and Rushan go by the name "Tajik" unlike other Pamiri groups.  The Shughani are engaged in mountain agriculture and have succeeded in a greater agriculture basis from the Rabbani government.  The Shughni stay in Shewa Adda all year long and sustain on mountain agriculture.  The Shughni were formerly raiders, but are now seen as servants and pedlars in big cities in Central Asia such as Kabul and Farghana.  They have also supplemented to 'scanty' resources in Shughnan.  The Shughani have also gone to Chitral in Pakistan to find jobs recently.

Language 

The Shughni language is an Eastern Iranian language of the Pamiri subgroup spoken in Tajikistan and Afghanistan, primarily in Gorno-Badakhshan and Sheghnan.  Shughani is the largest of the Pamiri languages and contains many dialects including Rushani, Bartangri, and Oroshori.

References 

Iranian ethnic groups
Pamiri people
Ethnic groups in Afghanistan